Rogersburg is an unincorporated community in Asotin County, in the U.S. state of Washington.

History
A post office called Rogersburg was in operation from 1912 until 1939. The community was named after G. A. Rogers, local landowner.

Rogersburg is accessible by Snake River Road, and the road travels along the Snake River before turning toward the mountains at the community.

References

Unincorporated communities in Asotin County, Washington
Unincorporated communities in Washington (state)